Sharswood may refer to:

Sharswood, Philadelphia, U.S., neighborhood
George Sharswood School, K–8 school in Philadelphia
George Sharswood (1810–1883), American jurist